Vanguard Visionaries is a greatest hits compilation of folk guitarist Sandy Bull, released in 2007 through Vanguard Records. It comprises pieces from his first four albums.

Track listing

Personnel 
Sandy Bull – acoustic guitar, banjo, oud, bass guitar, guitar, percussion
Denis Charles – tabla on "Carnival Jump"
Billy Higgins – drums
Vince Hans – production

References 

2007 greatest hits albums
Sandy Bull albums
Vanguard Records compilation albums